Los Indios is a U.S. border town in Cameron County, Texas. The population was 1,008 at the 2020 census. It is included as part of the Brownsville–Harlingen–Raymondville and the Matamoros–Brownsville metropolitan areas. The Free Trade International Bridge connects Los Indios with Matamoros, Tamaulipas.

History
Los Indios is likely named after a Spanish ranch and had its start in the year 1913 by the building of the San Benito and Rio Grande Valley Railway through that territory.

Geography

Los Indios is located at  (26.049729, –97.740140).

Demographics

2020 census

As of the 2020 United States census, there were 1,008 people, 232 households, and 169 families residing in the town.

2000 census
As of the census of 2000, there were 1,149 people, 273 households, and 245 families residing in the town. The population density was 668.0 people per square mile (257.9/km2). There were 310 housing units at an average density of 180.2 per square mile (69.6/km2). The racial makeup of the town was 53.79% White, 0.17% African American, 0.09% Native American, 43.95% from other races, and 2.00% from two or more races. Hispanic or Latino of any race were 95.82% of the population.

There were 273 households, out of which 56.8% had children under the age of 18 living with them, 64.1% were married couples living together, 21.2% had a female householder with no husband present, and 9.9% were non-families. 9.5% of all households were made up of individuals, and 4.8% had someone living alone who was 65 years of age or older. The average household size was 4.21 and the average family size was 4.46.

In the town, the population was spread out, with 39.9% under the age of 18, 11.0% from 18 to 24, 26.5% from 25 to 44, 15.5% from 45 to 64, and 7.2% who were 65 years of age or older. The median age was 24 years. For every 100 females, there were 84.4 males. For every 100 females age 18 and over, there were 80.9 males.

The median income for a household in the town was $19,702, and the median income for a family was $20,000. Males had a median income of $16,429 versus $12,014 for females. The per capita income for the town was $5,711. About 45.0% of families and 47.2% of the population were below the poverty line, including 57.1% of those under age 18 and 52.1% of those age 65 or over.

Los Indios hosts the only border crossing allowed for use by transmigrantes. Transmigrantes are those bringing cargo overland through Mexico to Central America, as opposed to cargo that has Mexico as its final destination. Most of this cargo being brought overland to Central America is in the form of used vehicles. Guatemala is the most common destination, with some cargo headed for Honduras and other Central American countries. Frequently there will be an early morning line of 200 plus vehicles waiting to cross the border at Los Indios, bound for Central America.

Education
Los Indios is located in the San Benito Consolidated Independent School District.

In addition, South Texas Independent School District operates magnet schools that serve the community.

Government and infrastructure
The United States Postal Service operates the Los Indios Post Office along U.S. Highway 281.

References

External links
 Los Indios, Tx in Handbook of Texas Online

Towns in Cameron County, Texas
Towns in Texas
Texas populated places on the Rio Grande